Meshaal Al-Ajmi is a Saudi Arabian footballer who plays for Al-Sharq as a defender .

External links
au.Eurosport.com Profile
FootballDatabase.eu Profile
Kooora.com Profile 
leaguespy.com Profile
slstat.com Profile

1992 births
Living people
Saudi Arabian footballers
Al-Shoulla FC players
Al-Kawkab FC players
Al-Riyadh SC players
Al-Sharq Club players
Saudi First Division League players
Saudi Professional League players
Saudi Second Division players
Association football defenders